Streight's Raid (19 April – 3 May 1863) took place in northern Alabama during the American Civil War. It was led by Union Army Col. Abel Streight and opposed by Confederate Brig. Gen. Nathan Bedford Forrest. Streight's goal was to destroy parts of the Western and Atlantic Railroad, which was supplying the Confederate Army of Tennessee. The raid was poorly supplied and planned, and ended with the defeat of Streight and his 1,700 men at Cedar Bluff, Alabama, by Forrest who bluffed his opponent into surrendering to his 500 men. Streight was additionally hindered by locals throughout his march, while pursued by Forrest, who had the advantage of home territory and the sympathy and aid of the local populace, most famously Emma Sansom.

Raid
The actual capture of Streight's forces was achieved by a clever ruse, when Forrest paraded his much smaller force back and forth in front of Streight, convincing him that he was opposed by a superior force. After surrendering and being informed of the deception Streight reputedly demanded his arms back for a proper fight, a request cheerfully declined by Forrest.

This unsuccessful raid was coordinated with the more famous Grierson's Raid, partially as a feint to confuse the Confederate forces.

Union losses were 12 killed, 69 wounded, and 1,466 captured, for a total of 1,547.

Chronology of events of Streight's Raid in 1863

Nashville, Tennessee (7–10 April) — proceeded by river
Palmyra, Tennessee (11–13 April) — proceeded on foot
Yellow Creek, Tennessee (13–14 April) — proceeded on foot
Fort Henry, Tennessee (15–17 April) — proceeded by river
Eastport, Mississippi (19–21 April) — proceeded either by foot or river
Bear Creek/River, Mississippi (22 April) — proceeded on foot the rest of the way
Tuscumbia, Alabama (24–26 April)
Mount Hope, Alabama (27–28 April)
Moulton, Alabama (28 April)
Day's Gap, Alabama (29–30 April)
Battle of Day's Gap (30 April)
Skirmish at Crooked Creek (30 April)
Skirmish at Hog Mountain (30 April)
Arrival at Blountsville (1 May)
Skirmishes at Blountsville (1 May)
Skirmishes at the East Branch of the Black Warrior River (1 May)
Skirmishes at the crossing of Black Creek, near Gadsden (2 May)
Damaged ammunition while crossing Will's Creek, near Gadsden (2 May)
Gadsden, Alabama (2 May)
Blount's plantation, about 15 miles from Gadsden (2 May)
Skirmishes at/near Blount's Plantation, Cherokee County (2–3 May)
Centre, Alabama (3 May)
Cedar Bluff, Alabama (3 May)
Surrender to Confederate General Nathan Bedford Forrest, 3 miles east of Cedar Bluff, Alabama (3 May)
Taken to Richmond, Virginia, as prisoners of war

Union order of battle

Colonel Abel D. Streight
 80th Illinois Infantry Regiment
 51st Indiana Infantry Regiment
 73rd Indiana Infantry Regiment
 3rd Ohio Infantry Regiment
 1st Middle Tennessee Cavalry Regiment (2 companies)

Notes

References

External links
Nathan Bedford Forrest Historical Society
Abel D. Streight biographical sketch in Streight Family Collection, ca. 1850-ca. 1945, Indiana Historical Society

Cavalry raids of the American Civil War
Battles of the Western Theater of the American Civil War
Military operations of the American Civil War in Alabama
The Lightning Mule Brigade
1863 in Alabama
Nathan Bedford Forrest
April 1863 events
May 1863 events